Predia (stylized as predia) was a Japanese idol girl group formed by Platinum Production in 2010.

History
Predia was formed in November 2010 as a sister group to Passpo. The group officially debuted on January 26, 2011, with the release of their first single "Dia Love". They released their first album Invitation on March 28, 2012.

Members

Timeline

Discography

Albums

Studio albums

Compilation albums

Extended plays

Singles

Notes

References

External links
 

Japanese girl groups
Japanese idol groups
Musical groups established in 2010
2010 establishments in Japan
Musical groups disestablished in 2022
2022 disestablishments in Japan